ARB Apex Bank is a mini central bank for the Rural & Community Banks (RCBs). 
The basic facts:
January 2000 - bank was registered as a public limited liability company
June 2001 - received a banking license 
August 2001 - admitted to the Bankers Clearing House as the 19th member.
March 2021 - admitted into the Ghana-Sweden Chamber of Commerce.

It started its banking business on 2 July 2002. In 2018, it claimed to be the first bank in Ghana to issue bank cards to EMV standards which allow payments on the Gh-link platform.

Rural banks are financed mainly via the Rural Financial Services Project (RFSP), that is a project of the Government of Ghana to solve the operational problems of the rural financial sector. Every Rural and Community bank in Ghana was mandated to contribute two thousand Ghana cedis to buy shares of the ARB – Apex bank Ltd, to enable the bank become accountable to the rural and community banks. So every rural and community bank in Ghana own two thousand Ghana cedis worth of shares in Apex Bank. The remaining shares of the bank are also owned by the government of Ghana. The acronym ARB stands for the Association of Rural Banks.

See also 
Atwima Rural Bank Ltd

References

External links 
Homepage

Banks of Ghana
Companies based in Accra
Banks established in 2001
Ghanaian companies established in 2001